Toamasina Autonomous Port or  Société de Gestion du Port Autonome de Toamasina (SPAT) is a Malagasy government body that governs and regulates the Indian Ocean port of Toamasina.  The operation of the port has been contracted to Madagascar International Container Terminal Services (MICTS), a subsidiary of Filipino company International Container Terminal Services Inc.  Toamasina is Madagascar's primary cargo port.

Passenger transport
There is a monthly passenger service from Toamasina to La Réunion and Mauritius with MS Mauritius Trochetia operated by Mauritius Shipping Corporation Ltd.

See also
Government of Madagascar
Port authority
Port operator
Transport in Madagascar

References

External links
  Toamasina Autonomous Port official site
  Madagascar International Container Terminal Services

Government of Madagascar
Transport in Madagascar
Port authorities
Ports and harbours in Africa
Toamasina